Novospassky (masculine), Novospasskaya (feminine), or Novospasskoye (neuter) may refer to:
Novospassky Bridge, a bridge over the Moskva River in Moscow, Russia
Novospassky District, a district of Ulyanovsk Oblast, Russia
Novospassky Monastery, a fortified monastery in Moscow, Russia
Novospassky (inhabited locality) (Novospasskaya, Novospasskoye), several inhabited localities in Russia

See also
 Spassky (disambiguation)